Zdeněk Šmíd (born February 3, 1980) is a Czech former professional ice hockey goaltender. He played mostly in his home country, with appearances in both the top and second-level Czech hockey leagues. Šmíd also appeared in both the Finnish SM-liiga - 18 games with HPK - and the Swedish Hockey League - one game with Luleå HF - during the 2001–02 season. He was the starting goalie for the Czech team that won the 2000 World Junior Ice Hockey Championships.

Šmíd was selected by the Atlanta Thrashers in the 6th round (168th overall) of the 2000 NHL Entry Draft, but opted to remain in the Czech championship longer.

He retired at the early age of 26 following long struggles with injury, and has ever since started working on his father's construction company.

References

External links 

1980 births
Living people
HPK players
Atlanta Thrashers draft picks
Czech ice hockey goaltenders
HC Slavia Praha players
HC Sparta Praha players
HC Plzeň players
HC Bílí Tygři Liberec players
HC Karlovy Vary players
Luleå HF players
Sportspeople from Plzeň
Czech expatriate ice hockey players in Sweden
Czech expatriate ice hockey players in Finland